Gabriel Ioan Paraschiv (born 27 March 1978) is a Romanian former football player, currently the manager of Liga III side Flacăra Moreni.

He played his 100th match for Oțelul Galați against former Romanian champions CFR Cluj.

Statistics

Statistics accurate as of match played 26 November 2013

Honours
Oțelul Galați
Liga I: 2010–11
Supercupa României: 2011

References

External links

1978 births
Living people
Romanian footballers
Association football midfielders
Romania international footballers
Liga I players
Liga II players
CSM Flacăra Moreni players
FCM Târgoviște players
FC Petrolul Ploiești players
ASC Oțelul Galați players
Romanian football managers
CSM Flacăra Moreni managers
People from Moreni